Plethadenia is a genus of flowering plants belonging to the family Rutaceae.

Its native range is Cuba to Hispaniola.

Species:

Plethadenia cubensis 
Plethadenia granulata

References

Zanthoxyloideae
Zanthoxyloideae genera